Étienne Mimard (1862 in Sens – 1944) was a French arms manufacturer who, with Pierre Blachon, another arms manufacturer, founded the Manufacture Française d'Armes et Cycles de Saint-Étienne, which became Manufrance in 1947.

Some years after buying the Martinier-Collin company, Mimard and Blachon settled on the site in the Cours Fauriel, built by the  architect Lamaizière. The list of their innovations is important: they created a large factory, a centre of technical innovation, a novel system of mail order sales (printing of the Manufrance catalogue reached a million copies), a print centre (Le Chasseur français magazine) and made renowned rifles (Robust, Ideal, Simplex, etc.).

Anecdotes
According to legend, Mimard would have wanted to be buried standing up opposite his firm. He was a typical entrepreneur and ideal type of the 19th century. From his office he had a view over all of his factories, and he had modified the keyboards of the firm's typewriters so that typists trained there could not work elsewhere.

Bibliography 
 N. Besse, J.-P. Burdy and M. Zancarini, « L’usine modèle de Monsieur Mimard, 1885-1938 », in L’industrie du cycle à Saint-Etienne : mythes et réalités : aspects économiques, techniques, culturels et sociaux, Saint-Etienne, Musée d’art et d’industrie, mission du patrimoine ethnologique, 1984
 Monique Luirard, « Économie et politique nationales : Étienne Mimard et la France de son temps », in Bulletin du Centre d'Histoire Régionale/Université, n° 2, St-Etienne, 1984

1862 births
1944 deaths
French industrialists
Saint-Étienne